Idhe Maa Katha is a 2021 Indian Telugu-language drama film written and directed by Guru Pawan, produced by Golla Mahesh through Gurrappa Parameswara Productions. The film has an ensemble cast of Srikanth, Sumanth Ashwin, Bhumika Chawla, and Tanya Hope. The film is depicted as a road-trip. It released on 19 March 2021.

Cast 
 Srikanth as Mahendra 
 Sumanth Ashwin as Ajay 
 Bhumika Chawla as Lakshmi
 Tanya Hope as Meghana
 Saptagiri
 Subbaraju
 Prudhvi Raj
 Sameer
 Ram Prasad
 Badram
 Srijita Ghosh
 Sandhya Janak
 Madhumani

Production 
Principal photography of the film was done in early 2020. The film's production was halted due to COVID-19 pandemic in March 2020 and in November 2020, the shooting of the film resumed, following the relaxation of COVID-19 lockdown in India.

Release 
The film received mixed review from critics with The Times of India calling it "A biker film that’s neither adventurous nor engaging". The film was a commercial failure.

References

External links 
 

2021 drama films
2020s drama road movies
2020s Telugu-language films
Indian drama road movies